Economic Advisory Council is a non-constitutional and independent body formed to give economic advice to the Government of Pakistan, specifically the Prime Minister.

Organization
In August 2021, the new government of Prime Minister Imran Khan reconstituted the council with the following members formed by the Prime Minister on Ministry of Finance recommendations for the Finance division under its Implementations and Economic Reforms Unit:

Among the members several retained their positions in Council from previous government, three members of the council belongs to non-economics background, and seven are ex or current office holder members including Asad Umar, on whose recommendations Council is formed.

Council was also criticised for the lack of female representation.

Resigned members 
 Dr Atif Mian - Professor at Julis-Rabinowitz Center for Public Policy and Finance of Woodrow Wilson School at Princeton University.
 Dr Asim Ijaz Khwaja - Sumitomo-FASID Professor of International Finance and Development at the Harvard Kennedy School, Harvard University. 
 Dr Imran Rasul - Professor of Economics, Department of Economics, University College, London.

Inclusion of renowned economist Atif Mian resulted in a controversy when former Deputy Speaker of Sindh Assembly Shehla Raza's social media team tweeted a racial and religious tweet against Mian, who belongs to Ahmadiyya faith. However, she later apologized after receiving severe backlash. Previously Khan, himself was under backlash for naming Mian as his cabinet's Finance Minister, but he withdraw Mian's name saying he did not know that he belonged to Ahmadiyya community. Initially, PTI has supported its decision on Mian's inclusion in Council. However after days of biased social media criticism from extremist religious groups, senator Faisal Javed Khan announced on 7 September 2018 in a tweet that, "Atif Mian was asked to step down from the Advisory Council and he has agreed. A replacement would be announced later."

On 7 September 2018, Dr Khwaja resigned from the EAC protesting the government's decision to withdraw the nomination of Dr Mian. On 8 September 2018, Dr Rasul became the second EAC member who resigned in protest over Dr Mian's removal.

See also
 Economic Coordination Committee (Pakistan)

References

Economy of Pakistan
Government of Pakistan
Imran Khan administration